Ahmadabad (also Romanized as Aḩmadābād) is a village in Daran Rural District, in the Central District of Jolfa County, East Azerbaijan Province, Iran. At the 2006 census, its population was 80, in 25 families.

References 

Populated places in Jolfa County